Ceratosphaerella is a genus of fungi in the family Magnaporthaceae.

External links
 

Sordariomycetes genera
Magnaporthales